Farhana Mili is a Bangladeshi film and television actress.

Career
Mili's acting career started with the drama serial Jhut Jhamela. She debuted her film career as a lead actress in Monpura (2009).

Personal life
Mili is married to an engineer Rashidul Islam since 2011. Together they have a son (b. 2012).

Works
Filmography
Monpura (2009)
Television

References

Living people
Bangladeshi film actresses
Bangladeshi television actresses
Place of birth missing (living people)
Date of birth missing (living people)
Year of birth missing (living people)
21st-century Bangladeshi actresses